The 2014 women's road cycling season was the third for the  Astana BePink Women's Team cycling team, which began as Be Pink in 2012.

Team Roster

Ages as of 1 January 2014 As of April 2014.

Riders who joined the team for the 2014 season

Riders who left the team during or after the 2013 season

Season victories

Footnotes

References

Astana BePink
Astana BePink Women's Team season
Astana BePink Womens Team